

Details
 Blyth and Tyneside Poems & Songs  was a book, published in 1898. It contained well over 50 songs in its 126 pages.

The full title of the book was "Blyth and Tyneside Poems & Songs by James Anderson, (Pay Friday,) Blyth; J. Fraser, Scribe Office, Blyth Price One Shilling" and was a collection of poems written by James Anderson and printed by J. Fraser, Scribe Office, Blyth

A copy of the book is now held at the Border History Museum in Hexham, Northumberland, England.

The publication
The front cover of the book is as thus :-

BLYTH AND TYNESIDE<br/ >
POEMS & SONGS<br/ >
BY<br/ >
–	- – - – - <br/ >
JAMES ANDERSON, <br/ >
(PAY FRIDAY,) <br/ >
BLYTH<br/ >
J. Fraser, Scribe Office, Blyth

The cost of the publication was One Shilling

Contents
The contents included the following songs, mainly written in the Geordie dialect, often very broad, all written by James Anderson, and listed here in alphabetical order-<br/ >

 Aa wunder what canny aad Blyth 'll say noo
 Another Song in answer to James Armstrong
 At Heddon-on-the-Wall
 Aud Billy Henderson's wonderful coat, to the tune of Cappy's, the Dog
 Aw wish pay Friday wad cum, to the tune of Aw wish yor muther wud cum (This song was awarded first prize in the Newcastle Weekly Chronicle song competition of 1870)
 Aw wish that time wad cum, to the tune of John Anderson, my Joe
 Aw'll buy ne mair butter o' Paddison's wife, to the tune of Laird o' Cockpen
 Aw'll nivor gan drinkin' i' Blyth onny mair, to the tune of Laird o' Cockpen
 Be kind te yer wife
 Blyth sailor's farewell, to the tune of Laird o' Cockpen
 Bonny banks of o' Tyne
 Bonny bright eyed Mary
 Bonny Throckley Fell
 brightest gem on earth – (The)
 Clocks at the Central Station – (The)
 Four Seasons – (The)
 Friendship's Smile
 Half the lees they tell isn't true
 High price o' coals; or, Peggy's lament
 Honest workin' man
 Jack an' Nan
 Jennie and Jemmie, a parody on the song 'When ye gang awa, Jemmie'
 John Bryson, the Miners' Best Friend
 Last line – an' spent a jolly neet man
 Late Mr James Bonner – (The)
 Little favourite Pink Flower – (My)
 Local Poet's Lament for Jos Chater – (The)
 Man, know Thyself
 Mary on the Banks of Tyne
 Miseries of man
 Music
 Northumberland miners' strike, 1876
 Residence in Blyth – (My)
 Rural Retreat – (A)
 Sally and Bobby, to the tune of Cappy's, the Dog
 Sally and Sam
 Smiling Face – (A)
 Sweet Little Home by the Sea – (My)
 Thor's queer folks noo o' days
 Toast – (A), On taking a friendly Glass of Beer (awarded first prize in a competition)
 Tortoise-shell tom cat
 Town of Old Hexham – (The)
 True Manhood
 Walbottle Dene, to the tune of John Anderson, my Joe
 What did aw get married for?, to the tune of Green grows the rashes o
 What is Love
 Wor Bonny Pit Lad

See also 
Geordie dialect words
James Anderson

References

External links
 
 Farne archives – Blyth and Tyneside poems and songs – front cover
 Allan’s Illustrated Edition of Tyneside songs and readings

English folk songs
Songs related to Newcastle upon Tyne
Northumbrian folklore
Music books